The Wild Geese is a 1978 war film directed by Andrew V. McLaglen and starring Richard Burton, Roger Moore, Richard Harris, and Hardy Krüger. The screenplay concerns a group of mercenaries in Africa. It was the result of a long-held ambition of its producer Euan Lloyd to make an all-star adventure film similar to The Guns of Navarone or Where Eagles Dare. The producer and director would later make The Sea Wolves starring several cast members from this film.

The screenplay by Reginald Rose was based on an unpublished novel titled The Thin White Line by Daniel Carney. The film was named The Wild Geese after the Wild Goose flag and shoulder patch used by Michael "Mad Mike" Hoare's Five Commando, ANC, which in turn was inspired by a 17th-century Irish mercenary army Wild Geese. Carney's novel was subsequently published by Corgi Books under the same title as the film.

The novel was based upon rumours and speculation following the 1968 landing of a mysterious aeroplane in Rhodesia, which was said to have been loaded with mercenaries and "an African president" believed to have been a dying Moïse Tshombe.

Plot
Allen Faulkner, a former British Army colonel turned mercenary, arrives in London to meet merchant banker Sir Edward Matheson. The latter proposes an operation to rescue Julius Limbani, the imprisoned President of a southern African nation who is due for execution by General Ndofa. President Limbani is held in a remote prison in Zembala, guarded by a regiment of General Ndofa's troops known as the "Simbas".

Faulkner accepts the assignment and begins recruiting forty-nine mercenaries, including officers he had worked with previously: Capt. Rafer Janders, a skilled tactician, and Lt. Shawn Fynn, a former Irish Guards officer and pilot. Fynn also brings in Pieter Coetzee, a former soldier in the South African Defence Force who wishes only to return home and buy a farm. The mercenaries fly to Swaziland, where they are whipped into shape. With training complete, Janders exacts a promise from Faulkner to watch over his only son, Emile, should he not survive.

Because of an unexpected development, Faulkner is given only a day's notice to launch the mission. On Christmas Day, the fifty-man mercenary group parachute into Zembala by a HALO jump. One group rescues an alive, though sick, Limbani from a heavily guarded prison, while another group takes over a small, nearby airfield to await pick-up. Back in London, however, Matheson cancels the extraction flight at the last moment, having secured copper mining assets from General Ndofa in exchange for President Limbani. Stranded deep in hostile territory, the abandoned mercenaries fight their way through bush country, pursued by the Simbas. Many men, including Coetzee, are killed along the way.

The mercenaries make their way to Limbani's home village, hoping to start a rebellion, but realise that his people are too ill-equipped to fight. An Irish missionary living there informs the group of an old Douglas Dakota transport aircraft nearby that they can use to escape. As the Simbas close in, the mercenaries suffer heavy casualties holding them off in a climactic battle while Fynn starts the Dakota's engines. Janders is shot in the leg and unable to board the departing airplane. Faulkner is forced to kill him to spare him from capture and torture. The thirteen surviving mercenaries from the original fifty eventually manage to land at Kariba Airport, Rhodesia, but Limbani dies from a gunshot wound sustained during the escape.

Some months later, Faulkner returns to London and breaks into Matheson's home to confront him. Faulkner takes the half a million dollars in Matheson's safe to compensate the survivors and the families of those who died. Faulkner then kills Matheson and makes a swift getaway with Fynn. Faulkner fulfils his promise to Janders by visiting Emile at his boarding school.

Cast

 Richard Burton as Colonel Allen Faulkner
 Roger Moore as Lieutenant Shawn Fynn
 Richard Harris as Captain Rafer Janders
 Hardy Krüger as Lieutenant Pieter Coetzee
 Stewart Granger as Sir Edward Matheson
 Jack Watson as Regimental Sergeant Major Sandy Young
 Frank Finlay as Father Geoghegen
 Kenneth Griffith as Medic Arthur Witty
 Jeff Corey as Mr. Martin
 Barry Foster as Thomas Balfour
 Winston Ntshona as President Julius Limbani
 Ronald Fraser as Sergeant Jock McTaggart
 John Kani as Sergeant Jesse Blake
 David Ladd as Sonny
 Ian Yule as Sergeant Tosh Donaldson
 Patrick Allen as Rushton
 Brook Williams as Samuels
 Percy Herbert as Keith
 Jane Hylton as Mrs. Young
 Paul Spurrier as Emile Janders
 Patrick Holt as Skyjacker

Production

Development
The film was based on a novel, The Thin White Line, which Euan Lloyd read prior to publication. He optioned it and hired Reginald Rose to write the screenplay in June 1976. The budget was US$9 million.

United Artists was enthusiastic about the film, but insisted Lloyd give the director's job to Michael Winner. Lloyd refused and instead chose Andrew V. McLaglen, son of Victor McLaglen, a British-born American previously known mainly for making westerns. Euan Lloyd had a friendship with John Ford who recommended McLaglen to direct the film. The finance for the film was raised partly by pre-selling it to distributors based on the script and the names of the stars who were set to appear.

The African nation in the film is not named, but it is clearly meant to be Zaire (the modern Democratic Republic of the Congo). The film's promotional literature made the link clear as The Wild Geese was promoted at the time as the story of "50 steelhard mercs who undertake a terrifying mission in dangerous, sweltering Central Africa-very much like the Old Congo-to rescue and bring out a deposed and imprisoned black president". The film's villain, General Ndofa, described in the film as an extremely corrupt and brutal leader of a copper-rich nation in central Africa, was a thinly disguised version of President Mobutu Sese Seko. Likewise, the character of Julius Limbani, the deposed pro-Western leader who was imprisoned following the hijacking of an airliner was based upon Moïse Tshombe. Finally, the film's hero, Colonel Allen Faulkner, described as a British mercenary living in South Africa, was based on Colonel Michael "Mad Mike" Hoare. Like Faulkner, Hoare was a former British Army officer living in South Africa who worked as a mercenary and had been hired to fight for the Tshombe government in the Congo in 1964-1965. Hoare served as the film's "military and technical adviser" and very much approved of the film, which he praised as a realistic depiction of the mercenary sub-culture.

Casting
Although Lloyd had both Richard Burton and Roger Moore in mind for their respective roles from a relatively early stage, other casting decisions were more difficult. As the mercenaries were mostly composed of military veterans (some of whom had fought under Faulkner's command before), it was necessary to cast a number of older actors and extras into these physically demanding roles. A number of veterans and actual mercenary soldiers appeared in the film.

Northern Irish actor Stephen Boyd, a close friend of Lloyd's, was originally set to star as Sandy Young, the sergeant major who trains the mercenaries before their mission. However, Boyd died shortly before filming commenced and Jack Watson was chosen as a late replacement. He had previously played a similar role in McLaglen's 1968 film The Devil's Brigade.

Lloyd had offered the part of the banker Matheson to his friend Joseph Cotten, but scheduling difficulties meant that he also had to be replaced, this time by Stewart Granger.

Burt Lancaster originally hoped to play the part of Rafer Janders who in Carney's book was an American living in London. Lancaster wanted the part substantially altered and enlarged. The producers declined and in his place chose Richard Harris. Lloyd initially had reservations about casting Harris because of his wild reputation – he was blamed for Golden Rendezvous going over budget by $1.5 million due to his drinking and rewriting the script. The insurers only agreed to Harris' casting if Lloyd put up his entire salary as guarantee, Harris put up half of his $600,000 fee, and that the producer would sign a declaration at the end of every day saying Harris had not held up filming due to drinking, misbehaving or rewriting lines. According to Lloyd: "I'd already made enquiries about the hold ups on Golden Rendezvous". I discovered the blame was not entirely Richard's. So, as I wanted him for the part, I took the gamble. And it was a gamble. If he'd misbehaved and he'd started losing days it would have come out of my pocket". Harris did not know about the arrangement until the end of the shoot.

Hardy Krüger was not the first actor considered for the role of Pieter Coetzee. Lloyd originally thought of Curd Jürgens, but felt that Hardy seemed to fit. Krüger was also impressed by the script scenes played with Limbani.

Moore later quipped that "I was the only wild member of the cast. Harris and Burton were on the wagon and Krüger never emerged from his room with his lady". Moore's character was nearly offered to O. J. Simpson after confusion on the American financier's part regarding the character being described as black Irish.

Lloyd hesitated before offering the role of Witty, the gay medic, to his longtime friend Kenneth Griffith. When finally approached, Griffith said "Some of my dearest friends in the world are homosexuals!" and accepted the part.

Percy Herbert, who played the role of Keith, was a veteran of World War II, in which he had been wounded in the defence of Singapore, then captured by the Imperial Japanese Army and interned in a POW camp.

Alan Ladd's son David Ladd and Stanley Baker's son Glyn Baker also had roles in the film. Ladd played the drug-dealing nephew of a London-based mob boss (Jeff Corey), and Baker played the young mercenary Esposito. With the cast made up from so many veteran actors, Baker claimed that the only reason he stayed alive in the plot so long was that he was one of the few actors young and fit enough to carry President Limbani for any period of time. David Ladd's character's girlfriend in the film was played by Anna Bergman, the daughter of Ingmar Bergman.

Ian Yule, who played Tosh Donaldson, had been a real mercenary in Africa in the 1960s and 1970s. He was cast locally in South Africa. He then brought his former commanding officer, Michael "Mad Mike" Hoare, who had led one legion of mercenaries, 5 Commando, Armée Nationale Congolaise (not to be confused with 5 Commando, the Second World War British Commando force), in the Congo Crisis of the 1960s, to be the technical adviser for the film. a role which he shared with Yule.

John Kani played Jesse Blake, a mercenary who had previously served with Faulkner and was struggling to live before the chance to work with Faulkner again. Palitoy based the figure "Tom Stone" (part of the Action Man team) on the character Blake after looking at the pre-production photos and posters of the film. Subsequently, some modifications to the figure were made. Kani made his debut in the film after years of acting and stage performances with Winston Ntshona. Ntshona was Limbani in the film and continued to make many more films with Kani after The Wild Geese.

Kani and Ntshona say they both turned down roles in the film at first after hearing it would be about mercenaries, only to change their mind after reading the script. As Kani commented: "The film could not come at a better time. We know exactly what is happening in Africa today and a movie that devotes – out of 120 minutes – even three quarters of a minute to say we need each other and to say that a white man can be just as much an African as a black man, that's important".

Rosalind Lloyd, who played Heather, is Euan Lloyd's daughter. Her mother, actress Jane Hylton, played Mrs Young.

Filming
Principal filming took place in South Africa in the summer and autumn of 1977, with additional studio filming at Twickenham Film Studios in Middlesex. Roger Moore estimated location filming in Africa took about three months with the unit taking over a health spa near Tshipise in Northern Transvaal (now Limpopo); shooting also took place at Messina Border Region. The fictional country is said to lie on the border with Burundi, Rhodesia and Rwanda and Zambia, Uganda and Swaziland are also mentioned to be close by.

The rugby scenes were filmed over a period of two days at Marble Hill Park in Twickenham with extras drafted in from nearby Teddington Boys' School. Marble Hill Close near Marble Hill Park was also used as a location.

Most of the military equipment used in the film came from the South African army, but some special weaponry needed to be imported from Britain, as Lloyd commented: "Even though the stuff couldn't fire real bullets, it was held up for weeks by the British government because it was going to South Africa". South Africa was subjected to a mandatory arms embargo imposed by the United Nations Security Council Resolution 418 in 1977.

Soundtrack
The music, by Roy Budd, originally included an overture and end title music, but both of these were replaced by "Flight of the Wild Geese", written and performed by Joan Armatrading. All three pieces are included on the soundtrack album, as well as the song "Dogs of War" that featured lyrics sung by the Scots Guards to Budd's themes. Budd used Borodin's String Quartet No. 2 as a theme for Rafer. The soundtrack was originally released by A&M Records then later released under licence as a Cinephile DVD.

Release
The Wild Geese, enjoyed a Royal premiere in support of Scope, with most of the stars of the film present along with John Mills. The film was a considerable commercial success in Britain and other countries worldwide. It was one of the most popular movies of 1978 at the British box office.

Although it grossed $3,630,250 in its first 10 days of release in the United States and Canada from 550 theatres, the film was only partially distributed in the United States because of the collapse of its American distributor Allied Artists and the movie lacked a marketable American star. It went on to earn theatrical rentals of $3.5 million there.

Reception
On the review aggregator Rotten Tomatoes, the film holds a 67% approval rate with a weighted average of 6.40/10 from 9 critics. The film also won a Golden Screen Award. As for the negative side of its reviews, it was chosen as "Dog of the Year" by film critic Gene Siskel, who accused the film of being "deadly dull" and claimed that it "exploits racism as some kind of sporting entertainment".

David Harkin reviewing the film at The Movie Buff suggested that the film was "a heady mix of suspense, comedy, drama, and action. It's dated, particularly in its politics, but still well worth seeing".

However, the production was subject of controversy because of its portrayal of black characters and the decision to film in South Africa during apartheid. Anti-apartheid campaigners protested at the film's London premiere. Warned of the protest, producer Lloyd brought copies of newspaper articles reporting the film's premiere in the black township of Soweto where it had been received with enthusiasm and approval. In Ireland, the Irish anti-apartheid movement protested outside cinemas that showed the film.

In a later interview actor Hardy Krüger complained about how his character was portrayed in the film:
For this kind of a delicate story in Africa with an element of battle in it, there has to be some shoot-out. But Euan Lloyd, a man I respect very much, chose to hire Andrew McLaglen who's basically a director of westerns. He brought this element into The Wild Geese that didn't really belong there – the shoot 'em up cowboy kind of thing. It overwhelmed the basic theme. There are certain directors, and Andrew is one, who, when it comes to the editing, always puts a moment in the film when somebody talks. I'm a listener as an actor – a reactor – and it was very important to me to listen. I played the whole part like that: I'm listening to this black man on my shoulder, and it's by listening that I'm beginning to understand that I'm the dumb Boer and he's the intelligent man who we all need. So Andrew butchered my performance by not understanding that you can play a part by listening. My character didn't really come out, because you didn't see the transformation. I don't know why Euan allowed him to do it.

Sequel
Euan Lloyd produced a sequel, Wild Geese II (1985), based on the novel Square Circle (later republished as Wild Geese II), also by Daniel Carney. Burton was planning to reprise his role as Colonel Allen Faulkner, but he died days before filming began. Roger Moore had also considered reprising his role in the sequel, but declined. In the sequel, Edward Fox played Alex Faulkner (the Burton character's brother), who is hired to break Nazi war criminal Rudolf Hess (played by Laurence Olivier) out of Spandau Prison so he can appear for a media interview.

Proposed remake
Producer Gianni Nunnari had first bought the rights to remake through his company Hollywood Gang Productions in 2007. Rupert Sanders was attached to direct. In August 2017, New Republic Pictures and Filmula attempted to produce a remake of the film with William Monahan writing the screenplay. By November 2021, the film was revealed to still be in development, with Providence Film Group and New Republic Pictures producing from the script written by William Monahan.

See also
 The Sea Wolves
 The Dogs of War
 The Expendables

Books

Notes

External links
 
 The Making of "The Wild Geese"

1978 films
1970s war drama films
1970s adventure drama films
Allied Artists films
British war drama films
Swiss war drama films
English-language Swiss films
1970s English-language films
Films based on Zimbabwean novels
Films set in Africa
Films set in Rhodesia
Films directed by Andrew McLaglen
Films shot in South Africa
War adventure films
Films with screenplays by Reginald Rose
Films scored by Roy Budd
Films shot in England
Films set in Eswatini
Films set in 1977
Films set in 1978
Films shot in Eswatini
Films about mercenaries
1978 drama films
Films about coups d'état
Films set in London
Films set in the Democratic Republic of the Congo
Films shot at Twickenham Film Studios
1970s British films